Fencourt  is a rural locality in the Waipa District and Waikato region of New Zealand's North Island.

It is located north of Cambridge

The area was originally the "Fen Court Estate", and was swampy land (fen) provided to soldiers after the 1863–64 Invasion of the Waikato. The land was drained and farmed for sheep and cattle, with gardens and orchards, and a Clydesdale stud. In 1899 it was subdivided into 41 farms.

Demographics
The SA1 area is part of the larger Fencourt statistical area.

The SA1 area had a population of 246 at the 2018 New Zealand census, unchanged since the 2013 census, and an increase of 42 people (20.6%) since the 2006 census. There were 87 households, comprising 120 males and 126 females, giving a sex ratio of 0.95 males per female. The median age was 42.8 years (compared with 37.4 years nationally), with 42 people (17.1%) aged under 15 years, 48 (19.5%) aged 15 to 29, 117 (47.6%) aged 30 to 64, and 39 (15.9%) aged 65 or older.

Ethnicities were 97.6% European/Pākehā, 7.3% Māori, 1.2% Pacific peoples, and 1.2% Asian. People may identify with more than one ethnicity.

Although some people chose not to answer the census's question about religious affiliation, 52.4% had no religion, and 36.6% were Christian.

Of those at least 15 years old, 42 (20.6%) people had a bachelor's or higher degree, and 42 (20.6%) people had no formal qualifications. The median income was $36,900, compared with $31,800 nationally. 51 people (25.0%) earned over $70,000 compared to 17.2% nationally. The employment status of those at least 15 was that 117 (57.4%) people were employed full-time, 39 (19.1%) were part-time, and 12 (5.9%) were unemployed.

Fencourt statistical area

The statistical area had a population of 717 at the 2018 New Zealand census, an increase of 48 people (7.2%) since the 2013 census, and an increase of 159 people (28.5%) since the 2006 census. There were 240 households, comprising 348 males and 369 females, giving a sex ratio of 0.94 males per female. The median age was 42.7 years (compared with 37.4 years nationally), with 162 people (22.6%) aged under 15 years, 111 (15.5%) aged 15 to 29, 351 (49.0%) aged 30 to 64, and 96 (13.4%) aged 65 or older.

Ethnicities were 96.7% European/Pākehā, 8.4% Māori, 0.8% Pacific peoples, and 1.7% Asian. People may identify with more than one ethnicity.

The percentage of people born overseas was 15.9, compared with 27.1% nationally.

Although some people chose not to answer the census's question about religious affiliation, 51.9% had no religion, 38.1% were Christian, 0.8% were Muslim, 0.4% were Buddhist and 0.4% had other religions.

Of those at least 15 years old, 123 (22.2%) people had a bachelor's or higher degree, and 87 (15.7%) people had no formal qualifications. The median income was $43,300, compared with $31,800 nationally. 165 people (29.7%) earned over $70,000 compared to 17.2% nationally. The employment status of those at least 15 was that 315 (56.8%) people were employed full-time, 108 (19.5%) were part-time, and 18 (3.2%) were unemployed.

Education
Goodwood School is a coeducational contributing primary school, serving years 1 to 6. The school opened in 1902.

References

Waipa District
Cambridge, New Zealand
Populated places in Waikato